Genge is an English surname. Notable people with the surname include:

 Colin Genge (1859–1910), Canadian politician and contractor
 Ellis Genge (born 1995), English rugby union player
 Ken Genge (Kenneth Lyte Genge) (born 1933), former Canadian Anglican bishop
 Paul Genge (1913–1988), American actor
 Stewart Genge, member of the National Australia men's national pitch and putt team in the World Cup 2008
 William Genge, Abbot of Peterborough 1397-1408

English-language surnames